Fred P. Goodwin (1888–1945) was an English professional footballer who played as an outside forward in the Southern League for Brighton & Hove Albion and Exeter City. He made one appearance in the Football League for Burnley.

Career 
Goodwin joined First Division club Burnley in November 1906. His sole appearance was the only match of the 1906–07 season that regular outside left Albert Smith missed. Between 1906 and 1911, Goodwin played in non-league football for Leek, Congleton Town and Macclesfield. In May 1911, he was transferred to Southern League First Division club Brighton & Hove Albion. During a match versus Luton Town in April 1912, Goodwin was involved in an incident which led to the death of Luton's Sam Wightman. A late tackle caught Wightman in the stomach and following a rupture to his small intestine, he died from peritonitis and shock. Goodwin was exonerated from all blame following the coroner's recommendation, who stated "that the kick was done purely accidentally". Goodwin later played for West Ham United and Exeter City. During Exeter's 1914 tour of South America, Goodwin was involved in every single match, which included the Brazilian national team's first ever fixture.

Personal life 
After pre-war service with the Cheshire Regiment, Goodwin served as a sergeant in the Football Battalion and the London Regiment during the First World War. Wounds suffered during the war ended his football career.

Honours 
Macclesfield

 Manchester League: 1908–09

Career statistics

References

1888 births
1945 deaths
Sportspeople from Macclesfield
English footballers
Association football outside forwards
Burnley F.C. players
Congleton Town F.C. players
Macclesfield Town F.C. players
Brighton & Hove Albion F.C. players
West Ham United F.C. players
Exeter City F.C. players
English Football League players
Military personnel from Cheshire
British Army personnel of World War I
Middlesex Regiment soldiers
Southern Football League players
Cheshire Regiment soldiers
London Regiment soldiers